Tokuyuki Hidaka (born August 31, 1916) played for Hankyu of Nippon Professional Baseball in 1936 and 1940. He was without a hit in 15 at-bats the first season and was 0-for-1 the latter. As a pitcher, he made a start in 1940, going 0-1 with an 11.57 ERA. He also played outfielder and first base.

References

1916 births
Possibly living people